Ariel Shainski (Hebrew: אריאל שאינסקי; born 2 April 1993) is an Israeli badminton player.

Achievements

BWF International Challenge/Series 
Men's doubles

Mixed doubles

  BWF International Challenge tournament
  BWF International Series tournament
  BWF Future Series tournament

References

External links 
 

1993 births
Living people
Israeli male badminton players
Maccabiah Games bronze medalists for Israel
Competitors at the 2013 Maccabiah Games
Competitors at the 2017 Maccabiah Games
Maccabiah Games gold medalists for Israel
Maccabiah Games medalists in badminton
21st-century Israeli people